Chapiquiña power plant is a hydroelectric power plant in northern Chile. It takes water from the Canal Lauca and produces electrical power through a Pelton turbine.

Structure 

The name Chapiquiña is derived from Aymara  and means "bed of thorns".

The water is held in a reservoir after exiting the plant before being discharged into the Quebrada Cosapilla; from there it flows into the Rio Seco and eventually into the San José River. There is also a rain gauging station at Chapiquiña.

Operation 
Chapiquiña produces about 10.2 megawatt of power which is injected into the Sistema Interconectado del Norte Grande, the regional power grid, through the Águila substation farther west. In 2013 the plant generated almost 44 GWh. It operates mainly when power consumption is high and is one of the few hydroelectric power plants in northern Chile.

Aside from producing electrical power, the water discharged into the San Jose River is intercepted downriver and used to irrigate the Azapa Valley; the reservoir downstream of the turbines serves to secure water delivery even when water is low in the Canal Lauca.

History 

Studies on the possibility to use the Lauca River as a water source for the Azapa Valley were made after 1945; during planning of the diversion the idea rose to use the drop at Chapiquiña for hydropower generation. Construction of the plant was started by the company ENDESA in 1962 and operations commenced in March 1967. Until 2017, it was the largest public works project in the Arica y Parinacota Region; the construction of the power plant was part of a series of public work projects in the 1960s–1970s in the Arica region. The plant underwent a number of ownership changes after it was built; it is currently owned by the company E-CL.

It was also planned to augment the water supply to the plant by pumping water from Lake Chungara, but in 1985 the Supreme Court of Chile disallowed such pumping for environmental reasons as Lake Chungara is located in the Lauca National Park. In 2012, the Spanish ambassador Iñigo de Palacio visited the plant; in the same year quenoa woodlands began to be planted in initially about  land owned by the plant as a conservation measure. Such trees provide nesting sites for birds and regulate the local water balance.

Notes

References

Sources

External links 

Hydroelectric power stations in Chile
Energy infrastructure in Arica y Parinacota Region